The Lundring Service Station is a historic former gas station in Canby, Minnesota, United States.  It was built in 1926 in the style of an English cottage.   The service station was listed on the National Register of Historic Places in 1986 for having local significance in the theme of architecture.  It was nominated for being a good example of the small, period revival gas stations built in the United States in the 1920s and 30s, and a distinctive use of English Cottage Revival architecture.

See also
 National Register of Historic Places listings in Yellow Medicine County, Minnesota

References

1926 establishments in Minnesota
Buildings and structures in Yellow Medicine County, Minnesota
Commercial buildings completed in 1926
Commercial buildings on the National Register of Historic Places in Minnesota
Gas stations on the National Register of Historic Places in Minnesota
National Register of Historic Places in Yellow Medicine County, Minnesota
Novelty buildings in Minnesota
Transport infrastructure completed in 1926
Transportation buildings and structures on the National Register of Historic Places in Minnesota
Tudor Revival architecture in Minnesota